Michael Grünberger is an Austrian luger and skeleton racer who competed during the 1990s.

As a skeleton athlete, he won two medals in the men's event at the FIBT World Championships with a gold in 1990 and a bronze in 1990. His best finish in the Skeleton World Cup was second twice in the men's event (1990-1, 1995-6).

Grünberger's only World cup victory in luge took place in Igls in 1990.

References
 List of men's skeleton World Cup champions since 1987.
 Lugesport.com profile
 Lugesport.com competition listings
 Men's skeleton world championship medalists since 1989
 Skeletonsport.com profile

Year of birth missing (living people)
Living people
Austrian male lugers
Austrian male skeleton racers